Events in the year 2017 in Costa Rica.

Incumbents
President: Luis Guillermo Solís
First Vice President: Helio Fallas Venegas
Second Vice President: Ana Helena Chacón Echeverría

Events
October – Hurricane Nate causes substantial damage.

Deaths

11 February – Juan Ulloa, footballer (b. 1935).

22 December – Gonzalo Morales Sáurez, painter (b. 1945).

References

 
2010s in Costa Rica
Years of the 21st century in Costa Rica
Costa Rica
Costa Rican